York Airport (York Aviation)  is a privately owned, public use airport located seven nautical miles (8 mi, 13 km) southwest of the central business district of York in the Thomasville section of Jackson Township, York County, Pennsylvania, United States. This airport, owned and operated by York Aviation, was included in the National Plan of Integrated Airport Systems for 2009–2013, which categorized it as a general aviation facility.

It is the second airport to bear the name.  The first one, which this one replaced when it closed sometime between 1953 and 1957, was located near the intersection of Roosevelt Ave and Wood Street in York, PA.

Facilities and aircraft 
York Airport covers an area of 66 acres (27 ha) at an elevation of 495 feet (151 m) above mean sea level. It has one runway designated 17/35 with an asphalt surface measuring 5,188 by 100 feet (1,581 x 30 m). The airport has several instrument approaches, including a GPS approach to each runway.

For the 12-month period ending December 9, 2011, the airport had 50,800 aircraft operations, an average of 139 per day: 96% general aviation, 3% air taxi, and 1% military. At that time there were 82 aircraft based at this airport: 76.8% single-engine, 15% multi-engine, 6% helicopter, and 2% jet.

For the 12-month period ending Feb 26, 2021, the airport had 52,750 aircraft operations, an average of 144 per day: 31,400 local general aviation, 20,000 transient general aviation, 1,050 air taxi, and 300 military.  There were 68 aircraft based at the airport: 56 single-engine, 5 multi-engine, 5 jet, and 2 helicopters.

Stat MedEvac, a flight medic agency, operates their 13th base out of the York Airport, staffing one helicopter. Spring Grove Area Ambulance (York County Station 4) also utilizes the York Airport as a secondary station, in addition to their primary station in Spring Grove, PA.

A restaurant named Orville's operated on the field until November, 2008 when it was closed.

Afterwards, a restaurant, named Kitty Hawk, took Orville's place and catered to both airborne (fly in) and terrestrial (drive up) patrons. This restaurant closed about 2013, and the space is currently empty.

York Airport offers flight lessons which are operated by York Flight Training LLC with 4 Instrument Flight Rules (IFR) equipped Cessna 172 aircraft.

The airport is also home of the York Squadron of Civil Air Patrol.  Squadron 301 is the oldest continuously active composite squadron in the world.

References

External links 
 York Airport
 York Airport at Pennsylvania DOT Bureau of Aviation
 Aerial image as of April 1999 from USGS The National Map
 
 
 York Civil Air Patrol

Airports in Pennsylvania
Transportation buildings and structures in York County, Pennsylvania